Kistelek is a town in Csongrád county, in the Southern Great Plain region of southern Hungary.

Geography

Twin towns – sister cities

Kistelek is twinned with:

 Gerace, Italy
 Poręba, Poland

References

External links

  in Hungarian, English and German

Populated places in Csongrád-Csanád County